Sù (粟) is a Chinese surname. Notable people with the surname include:

 Su Yu (Chinese: 粟裕; 1907 – 1984) Chinese military commander, general of the People's Liberation Army

See also
 :zh:Category:粟姓

Individual Chinese surnames